Victor Shoup is a computer scientist and mathematician. He obtained a PhD in computer science from the University of Wisconsin–Madison in 1989, and he did his undergraduate work at the University of Wisconsin-Eau Claire. He is a professor at the Courant Institute of Mathematical Sciences at New York University, focusing on algorithm and cryptography courses. He is currently a Principal Research Scientist at DFINITY and has held positions at AT&T Bell Labs, the University of Toronto, Saarland University, and the IBM Zurich Research Laboratory.

Shoup's main research interests and contributions are computer algorithms relating to number theory, algebra, and cryptography.  His contributions to these fields include:

 The Cramer–Shoup cryptosystem asymmetric encryption algorithm bears his name.
 His freely available (under the terms of the GNU GPL) C++ library of number theory algorithms, NTL, is widely used and well regarded for its high performance.
 He is the author of a widely used textbook, A Computational Introduction to Number Theory and Algebra, which is freely available online.
 He has proved (while at IBM Zurich) a lower bound to the computational complexity for solving the discrete logarithm problem in the generic group model. This is a problem in computational group theory which is of considerable importance to public-key cryptography.
 He acted as editor for the ISO 18033-2 standard for public-key cryptography.
One of the primary developers of HElib.

Bibliography
 A Computational Introduction to Number Theory and Algebra, 2nd Edition, 2009, Cambridge University Press,

References

Courant Institute of Mathematical Sciences faculty
Year of birth missing (living people)
University of Wisconsin–Madison College of Letters and Science alumni
American computer scientists
Theoretical computer scientists
Modern cryptographers
Public-key cryptographers
20th-century American mathematicians
21st-century American  mathematicians
Number theorists
IBM employees
Living people
University of Wisconsin–Eau Claire alumni
American cryptographers